Benjamin is a popular given name for males, derived from Hebrew , Bīnyāmīn, translating as "son of the right [hand]",in both Hebrew and Arabic languages  although in the Samaritan Pentateuch the name appears as "Binyaamem": "son of my days".

Benjamin is often shortened to Ben, and sometimes to Benny, Benito, Benji etc.  It is also a patronymic surname. Like many biblical names, it is popular in the Jewish, Christian and Muslim faiths alike, having many variant forms in other languages.

The "Benjamin of the family" is a phrase used in several languages to refer to the youngest son – especially when he is much younger than his brothers (see also the "youngest son" stock character in fiction). Sometimes the name is chosen for a son born to mature parents unlikely to have more children, especially if he has several older siblings. Both of these usages derive from the biblical son of Jacob of that name, who occupied that position in his family.

Alternate versions of the name exist for females, like Benjamina or Benjawan (used by some actresses and models in Thailand).

Given name

Notable people with the name Benjamin or its variant spellings include:

Benjamin II (1818–1864), the pen name of a Romanian traveller
Pope Benjamin II of Alexandria (1327–1339), Coptic Pope
Benjamin (Khazar), ruler of the late 9th and early 10th centuries 
Saint Benjamin (disambiguation), multiple people
Ben Affleck (born 1972), American film screenwriter, director and actor
Benjamin Agosto (born 1982), American figure skater
Benjamin Banneker (1731–1806), American author and surveyor
Ben Barnes (actor) (born 1981), British actor
Ben Bernanke (born 1953), former Chairman of the United States Federal Reserve
Benjamin Biolay (born 1973), French singer, songwriter, producer and actor
Benjamin F. Bowles (1869–1928), African American civil rights leader, and founder and president of Douglass University.
Benjamin Breedlove (1993–2011), American YouTube and internet personality
Benjamin Britten (1913–1976), British composer
Benjamin Burnley (born 1978), lead singer of American rock band Breaking Benjamin
Benjamin Butler (1818–1893), American lawyer, politician, soldier and businessman
Benjamin Carrigan (born 1998), Australian association football player
Benjamin F. Cheatham (1820–1886), Confederate general and California gold miner
Benjamin Chee Chee (1944–1977), Canadian artist
Benjamin Constant (1767–1830), Swiss-born French politician
Benjamin Constant (Brazil) (1836–1891), Brazilian general and politician
Benjamin Cutting (born 1987), Australian cricketer
Benjamin Diskin (born 1982), American voice actor
Benjamin Disraeli (1804–1881), Prime Minister of the United Kingdom
Benjamin Faunce (1873–1949), American druggist and businessman
Benjamin W. Fortson IV, American linguist
Benjamin Franklin (1706–1790), one of the Founding Fathers of the United States
Benjamin Graham (1894–1976), British-born American investor, economist, and professor
Benjamin Harrison (1833–1901), 23rd President of the United States
Benjamin Harrison V (1726-1791), a Founding Father of the United States, signer of the Declaration of Independence, and Governor of Virginia
Ben Hogan (1912–1997), American professional golfer
Ben Jonson (1572–1637), English playwright and poet, in his time second only to Shakespeare
Benjamin Kallos (born 1981), American lawyer and politician
Benjamin Kimutai (born 1971), Kenyan long-distance runner
Benjamin Kowalewicz (born 1975), lead singer of Canadian rock band Billy Talent
Benjamin H. Kline (1894–1974), American cinematographer and film director
Benjamin Lambert (1937–2014), American optometrist and politician
Benjamin Lay (1682–1759), Anglo-American abolitionist, activist, and humanitarian
Benjamin Leiner (Benny Leonard; the "Ghetto Wizard"; 1896–1947), American world champion lightweight Hall of Fame boxer
Benjamin Luxon (born 1937), British baritone singer 
Benjamin Mazar (1906–1995), Israeli historian and archeologist; President of the Hebrew University of Jerusalem
Benjamin McKenzie (born 1978), American actor
Benjamin K. Miller (judge) (born 1938), American judge
Benjamin Mkapa (1938–2020), 3rd President of Tanzania
Benjamin Mwangata (born 1966), Tanzanian boxer
Benjamin Netanyahu (born 1949), Israeli Prime Minister
Benjamin Nolot, American documentary filmmaker
Benjamin of Tudela, 12th-century Spanish rabbi
Benjamin Okolski, American figure skater
Benjamin Orr (1947–2000), American bass guitarist and singer-songwriter of The Cars
Benjamin Peltonen, Finnish recording artist, known mononymously as Benjamin
Benjamin Franklin Perera, Sri Lankan Sinhala diplomat
Benjamin Perrin, Canadian professor
Benjamin Rush (1746–1813), American politician, revolutionary, humanitarian, physician, educator, and founder of Dickinson College
Don Benjamin Rupasinghe Gunawardena (1904–1971), Sri Lankan politician
Benjamin Shapiro (born 1984), American conservative political commentator
Benjamin Frank Shelton (1902–1963) American singer
Benjamin Smoke (1960–1999), American musician
Benjamin St-Juste (born 1997), Canadian-American football player
Benyamin Sueb (1939–1995), Indonesian actor
Benjamin Tee, Singaporean scientist and inventor
Benjamin Timbrell (c. 1683–1754), English master builder and architect
Benjamin (Benji) Ungar (born 1986), American fencer
Benjamin de Vries (born 1923), Dutch-Israeli economic historian
Benjamin Wade (1800–1878), American lawyer and US Senator
Benjamin Wallace (circus owner) (1847–1921), American circus owner
Benjamin Wallace (writer), American author and magazine writer
Benjamin Lee Whorf (1897–1941), American linguist, known for contributing to the Sapir-Whorf hypothesis
Benjamin Wildman-Tobriner (born 1984), American 2008 Gold Medal Olympic swimmer and former world record holder
Benjamin Willoughby (1855–1940), Justice of the Indiana Supreme Court
Benjamin Yusupov (born 1962), Israeli classical composer, conductor and pianist
Benjamin Zendel, Canadian psychologist
Benjamin Zephaniah (born 1958), British poet and writer
Benjamin Zhang Bin (born 1974), Chinese Manhua artist and illustrator

Fictional characters 
 Benjamin, a donkey from George Orwell's novel Animal Farm
 Benjamin, in The Walking Dead television series
 Benjamin the Elephant (original German name Benjamin Blümchen), the main character of the same named television series
 Benjamin Bunny, Peter Rabbit's cousin in The Tale of Benjamin Bunny by Beatrix Potter
 Benjamin Button, the title character of both The Curious Case of Benjamin Button (short story) and film
 Benjamin C. L., known as Soldier Boy, from the third season of Amazon Prime Video's The Boys
 Benjamin Franklin Parker, known as Uncle Ben, from Marvel Comics's Spider-Man
 Principal Benjamin Krupp, the school principal and title character from Captain Underpants
 Capt. Benjamin Franklin "Hawkeye" Pierce, the main character from the M*A*S*H novels, the film and the television series
 Benjamin Richards/Ben Richards, main character in the 1987 movie The Running Man
 Benjamin Sisko, Commanding Officer of Deep Space Nine in the Star Trek: Deep Space Nine television series
 Benjamin Stilton, Geronimo Stilton's nephew and a main character in the Geronimo Stilton book series
 Benjamin Kirby Tennyson (better known as Ben or Ben 10) from Cartoon Network's Ben 10 franchise
 Gentle Ben, bear character created by Walt Morey, in the children's book and 1967 television series of the same name and the 1967 film Gentle Giant
 Benjamin "Ben" Gross, a character on Netflix's Never Have I Ever portrayed by Jaren Lewison
 Benjamin "Benjy" Compson, narrator of first section and mentally handicapped son of Jason from the William Faulkner novel "The Sound and the Fury".

Surname
Abraham Cornelius Benjamin (1897–1968), American philosopher
Adam Benjamin Jr. (1935–1982), American politician
Adam Benjamin (musician), American musician
Albert Benjamin (1909–2006), Scottish bridge player
Alec Benjamin (born 1994), American singer-songwriter
Andre Benjamin (born 1975), American musician and actor; co-founder of Outkast
Anna Smeed Benjamin (1834-1924), American social reformer 
Arthur Benjamin (1893–1960), Australian composer
Asher Benjamin (1773–1845), American architect
Benoit Benjamin (born 1964), American basketball player 
Collin Benjamin (born 1978), Namibian footballer 
Emmanuel Benjamin (born 1955), Indian cricketer
Eno Benjamin (born 1999), American football player
Eugene S. Benjamin (1862–1941), American businessman and philanthropist
François Benjamin (born 1962), Canadian politician
Floella Benjamin (born 1949), British actor and businesswoman
George Benjamin (composer) (born 1960), British composer
Georges C. Benjamin (born 1952), American public health official
H. Jon Benjamin (born 1966), American comedian and actor
Harry Benjamin (1885–1986), German-born American sexologist
Hilde Benjamin (1902–1989), East German judge and politician
J. J. Benjamin (1818–1864), Romanian-Jewish historian and traveler
Jessica Benjamin (born 1946), American feminist and psychoanalyst
Joel Benjamin (born 1964), American chess grandmaster
John Benjamin (disambiguation), several people
Jon Benjamin (disambiguation), several people
Judah P. Benjamin (1811–1884), American politician and treasurer of CSA
Kelvin Benjamin (born 1991), American football wide receiver
Leanne Benjamin (born 1964), Australian ballet dancer
Lewis Saul Benjamin (1874–1932), birth name of English author Lewis Melville
Lucy Benjamin (born 1970), British actress
Melanie Benjamin (author), pen name of American writer Melanie Hauser (born 1962)
Miles Benjamin (born 1988), English rugby union player
Quanteisha Benjamin (born 1991/92), Canadian singer
Rai Benjamin (born 1997), American track athlete 
Raphael Benjamin (1846–1906), British-born Australian and American rabbi 
Regina Benjamin (born 1956), 18th Surgeon General of the United States 
René Benjamin (1885–1948), French author
Rich Benjamin, American journalist and writer 
Richard Benjamin (born 1938), American actor and film director
Rick Benjamin (disambiguation), several people
Ryan Benjamin (disambiguation), several people
Shelton Benjamin (born 1975), American wrestler
Simeon Benjamin (1792–1868), American businessman, philanthropist, and benefactor of Elmira College
Stan Benjamin (1914–2009), American baseball player
Trevor Benjamin (born 1979), English-born Jamaican footballer
Walter Benjamin (1892–1940), German philosopher, literary critic and writer
Zoe Benjamin (1882–1962), born Sophia Benjamin, Australian early childhood educator

Fictional characters
Judy Benjamin, main character in the 1980 film Private Benjamin

Variants 
 Arabic: بنيامين (Benyámén)
 Bengali: বিনয়ামিন, বিন ইয়ামিন, বনিয়ামিন, বেঞ্জামিন/বেনজামিন (Binyamin,  Boniamin , Benjamin/Benzamin)
 Chinese: 本杰明 (Běnjiémíng)
 Czech: Benjamín
 Dutch: Benjamin
 Ethiopia: Biniyam
 Eritrea: Biniyam
 French: Benjamin
 German: Benjamin
 Greek: Βενιαμίν (Veniamín)
 Hawaiian: Peni
 Hebrew: בנימין
 Hindi: बेंजामिन
 Hungarian: Benjámin
 Icelandic: Benjamín
 Indonesian: Benyamin
 Irish: Benjamin
 Italian: Beniamino
 Latin: Benjamin
 Japanese: ベンジャミン (Benjamin)
 Korean: 벤자민 (Benjamin)
 Lithuanian: Benjaminas, Benas
 Macedonian: Бенџамин, Венјамин (Bendžamin, Venyamin)
 Norwegian: Benjamin
 Portuguese: Benjamim
 Romanian: Benjamin
 Russian: Вениамин (Veniamin, Venyamin)
 Slovak: Benjamín
 Slovenian: Benjamin, Beno
 Spanish: Benjamín
 Swedish: Benjamin
 Telugu: బెన్యామీను (Benyaminu)
 Turkish: Bünyamin, Benyamin
 Yiddish: Binyomin

See also
 
 Benjamina (name)
 Youngest son stock character

References

English masculine given names
French masculine given names
Hebrew-language names
Masculine given names
Modern names of Hebrew origin
Spanish masculine given names